The order of battle for the Nanchang Campaign (Mid Feb. – Early May 1939)

Japan 
11th Army - Gen. Yasuji Okamura [1,2]
 6th Division - Lt. Gen. Shiro Inaba [4]
 9th Infantry Brigade
 11th Infantry Regiment
 41st Infantry Regiment
 21st Infantry Brigade
 21st Infantry Regiment
 42nd Infantry Regiment
 5th Mountain Artillery Regiment
 5th Cavalry Regiment
 5th Engineer Regiment
 5th Transport Regiment
 101st Division - Lt. Gen Masatoshi Saito [4]
 101st Infantry Brigade
 101st Infantry Regiment
 149th Infantry Regiment
 102nd Infantry Brigade
 103rd Infantry Regiment
 157th Infantry Regiment
 101st Field Artillery Regiment
 101st Cavalry Regiment
 101st Engineer Regiment
 101st Transport Regiment
 106th Division * - Lt. Gen. Atsuo Matsuura [4]
 111th Infantry Brigade
 113th Infantry Regiment
 147th Infantry Regiment
 136th Infantry Brigade
 125th Infantry Regiment
 145th Infantry Regiment
 106th Field Artillery Regiment
 106th Cavalry Regiment
 106th Engineer Regiment
 106th Transport Regiment
 Ishii Tank Unit - Col. Ishii [5]
 5th Tank Battalion -  Colonel Ishii
 7th Tank Battalion -  Lieut. Colonel Kusunose
 7th Independent Tankette Company - Captain Yamada
 [All the armored units together comprised 76 Type 89 medium tanks and 59 Type 94 tankettes]
 2nd Battalion of 147th Infantry Regiment /106th Div. [6]
 1st Company of 3rd Independent Engineer Regiment[6]
 1 Platoon of 8th Divisional Transport Unit[6]
 120th Cavalry Regiment - Seinji Hasekawa[1]
 22nd Artillery Regt. - Houkichi Nakahira[1]
 6th Field Heavy Artillery Brigade HQ - Major Gen. Sumita[3]
 13th Field Heavy Artillery Regiment [15 cm howitzers]  Lt. Col. Okoshi[3]
 14th Field Heavy Artillery Regiment [15 cm howitzers]  Lt. Col. Maruyama[3]
 10th Field Heavy Artillery Regiment [15 cm howitzers]  Lt. Col. Nagaya[3]
 15th Independent Field Heavy Artillery Regiment [10 cm cannons]  Col. Horikawa[3]
 101st Field Artillery Regiment [75mm field guns] Lt. Col. Yamada[3]
 3rd Independent Mountain Gun Regiment [75mm mountain guns] Lt. Col. Morikawa[3]
 106th Field Artillery Regiment [75mm field guns] Lt. Col. Uga[3]
 2nd Battalion/2nd Independent Mountain Gun Regiment [75mm mountain guns] Major Matsumoto[3]

Naval:
T Operation Fleet - Rear Admiral Keijiro Goga [6]
　Main unit 
 1st Base Force
 Asuka 
　Advanced unit
 Hira
 Futami 
　Rear Guard 
 Kotaka 
 2nd Gunboat Unit 
 3rd Gunboat Unit
　Advanced Guard 
 1st Minesweeper Unit and other small craftIncluding the Sumiyoshi Maru and the Hayase 
　Kure 5th SNLF 
　4th Gunboat Unit

Naval Airforce: 
 Air Unit [6,7]
 River Plane Unit of 1st Base Force
 aircraft ?
 12th Air Unit Kōkūtai 
 Fighter daitai - ? Mitsubishi A5M
 Bomber daitai - ? Yokosuka B3Y1

Army Airforce:
3rd Flight Group - Major Gen. Sugawara [6,7]
 Independent 17th Flying Squadron [17th Dokuritsu Hiko Chutai] - cdr ?, base: Central China
 ? Aircraft type, Reconnaissance squadron
 45th Flying Sentai - cdr ?,  base: Central China
 ? Aircraft type, Light bomber unit
 75th Flying Sentai - cdr ?,  base: Central China
 ? Aircraft type, Light bomber unit
 77th Flying Sentai - cdr ?,  base: Wuchang
 ? Kawasaki Ki-10 Fighter

Notes:
 9th Division in Yueh-Linhsiang area. [1]
 3rd, 13th, 116th Divisions North of Yangtze River vs. Chinese 5th War Area forces. [1]
 Only a portion of the 106th Division took part. [1]
 T Operation Fleet had over 30 ships and 50 motor boats and one battalion of Marines  [1]

China 
9th War Area - Chen Cheng [1]
 19th Army Group - Lo Cho-ying
 79th Corps - Hsia Chu-chung 
 118th Division - Wang Ling-yun
 76th Division - Wang Ling-yun
 98th Division - Wang Chia-pen
  49th Corps - Liu Tuo-chuan
 105th Division - Wang Tieh-han
 9th Res. Division - Chang Yen-chuan
  70th Corps - Li Chueh
 19th Division - Li Chueh (concurrent)
 107th Division - Tuan Heng
 32nd Corps - Sung Ken-tang
 139th Division - Li Chao-ying
 141st Division - Tang Yung-liang
 142nd Division - Fu Li-ping
 5th Res Division - Tseng Chia-chu
 Poyang Lake Garrison - Tseng Chia-chu
 3 Regts of Kiangsi Peace Preservation Force
 Lu Shan Guerrilla Command - Yang Yu-chen
 2 Peace Preservation Regts
 74th Corps - Yu Chi-shih
 51st Division - Wang Yao-wu
 58th Division - Feng Sheng-fa
 60th Division - Chen Pei
 Hunan - Hupei - Kiangsi Border Area Guerrilla Command - Fan Sung-pu 
 8th Corps - Li Yu-tang
 3rd Division - Chao Hsi-tien
 197th Division - Ting Ping-chuan
 73rd Corps - Peng Wei-jen
 15th Division - Wang Chih-pin
 77th Division - Liu Chu-ming
 128th Division - Wang Ching-tsai
 1st Guerrilla Command - Kung Ho-chung 
 4 columns 
 1st Army Group - Lung Yun, Dep. Cdr. -  Lu Han
 58th Corps - Sun Tu
 New 10th Division - Liiu Cheng-fu
 183rd Division -  Yang Hung-kuang
 3rd Corps - Chang Chung
 184th Division - Chang Chung (concurrent)
 New 12th Division - Kung Hsun-pi
 60th Corps - An En-pu
 182nd Division - An En-pu (concurrent)
 New 11th Division - Kung Hsun-pi
 30th Army Group - Wang Ling-chi
  78th Corps - Hsia Shou-hsun 
 New 13th Division - Liu Cheng-fu
 One Brigade of the New 16th Division - (command?)
 72nd Corps - Han Hsien-pu
 New 14th Division - Fan Nan-hsuan
 New 15th Division - Teng Kuo-cheng

From 3rd War Area 
7 Divisions of 32nd Army Group were mentioned in the text [1] as being in the counterattack to recapture Nanchang:

32nd Army Group -  Shangkuan Yun-hsiang
 29th Corps - Chen An-Pao
 26th Division - Liu Yu-ching
 (other divisions?)
25th Corps - Wang Ching-chiu
 79th Division ?
 5th Reserve Division  ?
 28th Corps - ?
 16th Division
91st Corps - ?
 10th Reserve Division
 102nd  Division - ?

Notes:

32nd Army Group divisions mentioned[1]:
 Attacking from area between Kan and Fu River
 16th Division/28th Corps - ?
 10th Reserve Division/91st Corps - ?
 Attacking from Fu River between Wu-yang-tu and Hsieh-fu-shih
 79th Division - ?
 5th Reserve Division - ?
 In reserve across the Fu River, later made final attack on Nanchang
 67th  Division - Mo Yu-shuo

Early reinforcement from 3rd War area, presumably part of 32nd Army Group
 102nd  Division - ?

On May 5, 1939, Chinese recovered Nanchang Train Station & Nanchang Airport, and fought bayonet wars with Japanese at city walls. 29th Corps Chief Chen An'bao sacrificed his life during the battle, and division chief Liu Yuqing was injured.

References
Hsu Long-hsuen and Chang Ming-kai, History of The Sino-Japanese War (1937-1945) 2nd Ed., 1971. Translated by Wen Ha-hsiung, Chung Wu Publishing; 33, 140th Lane, Tung-hwa Street, Taipei, Taiwan Republic of China. Pg. 293-300 Map. 14-15
Artillery force Xiushui River crossing
Generals from Japan (WWII)
Operation Nanchang http://www3.plala.or.jp/takihome/history.htm
Sino-Japanese Air War 1937-45

Battles of the Second Sino-Japanese War
Second Sino-Japanese War orders of battle